"The Midnight Choir" is the second single taken from The Thrills' third album, Teenager.  It was released on October 29, 2007, as a download-only single and did not chart in the UK Singles Chart.

The single was originally planned to be released on two 7" vinyl records (each with different artwork and B-sides) as well as on CD with a third new song. Seemingly at the last minute the physical formats were pulled and the song was released only as a download. One of the B-sides, "Mystery," was sent as a free download to members of the Thrills mailing list. The other B-sides, entitled "To Be A Spectacular Failure" (from the CD release) and "You're So Easy On Yourself," have not been released.

Track listing

References

2007 singles
The Thrills songs
Virgin Records singles
2007 songs